The 1916 Minnesota Golden Gophers football team represented the University of Minnesota in the 1916 college football season. In their 17th year under head coach Henry L. Williams, the Golden Gophers compiled a 6–1 record (3–1 against Western Conference opponents) and outscored their opponents by a combined total of 348 to 28.

End Bert Baston and quarterback Shorty Long were named All-Americans by the Associated Press.  Baston was also named an All-American by the Walter Camp Football Foundation.  Baston, guard Conrad L. Eklund tackle Frank Mayer and fullback Arnold "Pudge" Wyman were named All-Big Ten first team.

Schedule

References

Minnesota
Minnesota Golden Gophers football seasons
Minnesota Golden Gophers football